Aachariyangal is a 2012 Tamil-language fantasy thriller film written, produced and directed by debutant director Harshavardhan, starring Thaman Kumar, Aishwarya Rajesh, Reethu Mangal and Mahanadi Shankar. The film released on 24 August 2012.

Plot

Karthik (Thaman Kumar) wants a "spicy life" and asks God to make his life as eventful as possible. He gets a mysterious call from 'God', who tells his that his wish has been granted and his life will change for the better or worse in the next 25 days...

Cast

Production
The team of the film met actor Kamal Haasan in July 2012, with the director Harshavardhan being an alumnus of Kamal Haasan's 2009 screen-writing workshop.

Critical reception

Rohit Ramachandran of Nowrunning.com rated it 3.5/5 stating that "Aachariyangal's got a sophisticated plot that's narrated with due simplicity and directed with candid straightforwardness." Malini Mannath of The New Indian Express concluded "Aachariyangal is a fairly enagaging [sic] fare from a debutant maker, who has made an effort to strike a different chord." Times of India gave 2.5 stars out of 5 and wrote "if Aachariyangal works to a certain extent, it is mainly because of the inherent what-next suspense that the plot holds". Behindwoods gave 1.5 out of 5 and wrote "Aachariyangal might not make your day but it has its trump cards lined-up just when you feel like brushing it away".

The film went unnoticed commercially and resulted in a major loss for Harshavardhan, which he later admitted in 2018 on a video uploaded to his YouTube channel Showpepper TV.

References 

2012 films
2010s Tamil-language films
2012 directorial debut films